Malvika Sharma is an Indian actress and model who works in Telugu and Tamil language films. She has a qualification of advocate.

She made her debut with Nela Ticket (2018) alongside Ravi Teja. Her next film was Red (2021).

Personal life 
She is also pursuing a career in Law. She graduated from Rizvi Law College with a Bachelor of Laws degree with specialization in criminology.

Filmography

Films

References

External links 

 
 Malvika on Instagram

Actresses from Mumbai
21st-century Indian actresses
Actresses in Telugu cinema
Living people
Advocates
Year of birth missing (living people)